Ben Caplan is a Canadian folk musician from Halifax, Nova Scotia. He often performs with his band The Casual Smokers, and his first full-length studio album, In the Time of the Great Remembering, was released on October 20, 2011. His second record, Birds With Broken Wings, was released September 18, 2015. His third album, Old Stock, was released on June 15th, 2018, and his fourth album, recollection (reimagined), was released on October 15th, 2021.

Career

Early years
Ben Caplan was born and raised in Hamilton, Ontario and now resides in Halifax, Nova Scotia. He started playing the guitar at the age of 13, but it was at the age of 19 that he started his journey as an independent singer-songwriter. Although he  studied at the University of King's College, he decided that in order to have a career in music, it would have to become his priority. He participated in the Artist Entrepreneur program through Canada’s Music Incubator. He has been a touring musician since 2006 and released his first full-length album in 2011.

Touring
In 2011 Caplan toured across Canada, and performed some concerts in Europe as well.
In 2012, Ben Caplan & The Casual Smokers toured the east coast of Canada, performed at South by Southwest in Austin, Texas, and performed at the East Coast Music Awards (ECMA) Gala.

Caplan performed live at the 2013 Byron Bay Bluesfest that took place from March 30 to April 1.

From April to the end of July in 2013, Caplan played a number of shows that spread across Australia, the Netherlands, Germany, Switzerland, Poland, Norway, the United Kingdom, and Canada. Among these shows, he performed at Glastonbury Festival (UK), The Hop Farm Festival (UK), and Roots In The Park Music Festival (Netherlands).

In December 2013, Caplan returned to the Netherlands for a weekend tour that consisted of dates in Tilburg, Arnhem, and Haarlem.

From December 28, 2013 to January 10, 2014, Caplan played a series of shows in Australia and participated in the Woodford Folk Festival and Sydney Festival.

From February 21 to April 1, 2015, Caplan toured the United States for the first time. He performed three times during South By Southwest in Austin, Texas in the middle of the tour.

Between 2015 and 2016 Ben embarked on back to back North American and European Tours  While touring Europe Ben has received positive reviews major publications such as Independent UK and The Guardian UK who say "For all the fierceness of the Canadian's appearance, nothing quite prepares for his voice, both spoken and singing." and "From Satanic hoedowns to swaying country heartbreakers, this evening with the larger-than-life Caplan makes for rollicking fun." ranking him – 4/5 stars

Awards
Nova Scotia Music Awards 2012
 WON Entertainer of the Year
 Nominated for Digital Artist of the Year
 Nominated for New Artist of the Year
 Nominated for Male Artist Recording of the Year—In the Time of the Great Remembering 
 Nominated for Recording of the Year—In the Time of the Great Remembering
 Nominated for New Artist of the Year
 Nominated for SOCAN Songwriter of the Year

Hamilton Music Awards 2012
 WON Roots Recording of The Year

East Coast Music Awards 2013
 WON Rising Star Recording of the Year
 Nominated for Folk Recording of the Year

Nova Scotia Music Awards 2015
Nominated for Entertainer of the Year

East Coast Music Awards 2016
 Nominated for Album of the Year
 Nominated for Folk Recording of the Year
 Nominated for Song of the Year

Discography

Albums

References

External links

 Official Website
 Facebook
 Twitter
 YouTube
 Instagram
 Bandcamp

Living people
Year of birth missing (living people)
Musicians from Hamilton, Ontario
Musicians from Halifax, Nova Scotia
University of King's College alumni
Canadian folk musicians